Ban Luang may refer to several places in Thailand:

Ban Luang, Chom Thong
Ban Luang, Mae Ai
Ban Luang, Don Phut - Saraburi Province, Thailand
Ban Luang, Don Tum - Nakhon Pathom Province, Thailand